Maxim "Max" Aleksandrovich Fadeev (born 6 May 1968) is a Russian singer-songwriter, composer and producer.

Biography

Early life and career
Maxim Fadeev was born on 6 May 1968 in Kurgan, Kurgan Oblast, USSR. When he was a child, he attended a musical school in Kurgan, and learned how to play bass guitar. He later attended two universities, both musical, when aged only fifteen.

Fadeev started working with professional musicians in 1989, such as Larisa Dolina and Valery Leontyev. He was supported by showman and actor Sergei Kirillov, who also presented Fadeev to the world of professional music.

1993–2003: Linda and Star Factory 2
In 1993 Fadeev started managing singer Svetlana Geiman, who would later become famous as Linda. Fadeev wrote, produced and composed her music material. Having been managed by Fadeev, Linda rose to media attention and a quick shot to stardom followed, backed by both her over-the-top music which pleased the critics, and her offbeat, semi-ethnic, Tibet-driven visual persona, epitomised by the "Vorona", video which helped her to be eagerly accepted nationwide. The partnership of the two broke in 1999. Linda eventually started writing her songs herself.

After great success as a music producer, Fadeev was also successful as a television producer of the second season of Channel One's talent show Star Factory, Star Factory 2. Star Factory 2 eventually brought to prominence many popular Russian singers, such as Yulia Savicheva, Elena Temnikova, Irakly Pirzhalava, Pierre Narcisse, and Yelena Terleyeva. Savicheva eventually competed for Russia in the Eurovision Song Contest 2004, reaching the 11th place. Soon after Star Factory 2, Fadeev started managing singer Glukoza, who became a music star.

2003–present: Monolit Records, Star Factory 5 and Serebro

Fadeev established his own recording company, Monolit Records, in 2003. Located in Moscow, it soon became one of the most influential recording companies in Russia, as well as in the states of the former USSR. In 2004 Monolit Records produced and published the album of Katya Lel, Джага-Джага, which was certified Platinum in Russia.

In 2005, Fadeev returned to TV production as a co-producer of Channel One's talent show Star Factory 5. 

He later focused on his new project, the girl group Serebro. The band won the third place at the Eurovision Song Contest 2007, has won numerous awards since and became one of the most popular Russian pop acts of the decade. The band released their debut album, Opiumroz, on 25 April 2009 for Monolit Records.

Fadeev and Monolit Records opened an audition for a new solo female singer.

Cartoon Savva
In 2007, Fadeev wrote a book named Savva, and later wrote the original script for the cartoon of the same name. Glukoza Production is involved in producing the 3D cartoon Savva. Fadeev's son, Savva, is the prototype for the cartoon's main hero. 

In 2010, American screenwriter Gregory Poirier wrote the adaptation of the cartoon script for the US market, with Fadeev slated to direct the cartoon and compose the score. The premier of the cartoon was scheduled for 2013. In 2011 the voice cast was announced, including Sharon Stone, Whoopi Goldberg, Joe Pesci, Milla Jovovich, and Will Chase.

Managed projects

Current
Glukoza
Alisa Kozhikina
 Oleg Miami
 Irina Ponarovskaya

Former
Linda
Irakly Pirzhalava
Pier Narciss
Katya Lel
Lora
Konvoy
Percy
Victoria Ilinskaya
Star Factory 2
Star Factory 5
VORON
Kit-I
Olga Romanovskaya
Total
Serebro
MOLLY (Olga Seryabkina)
Nargiz Zakirova
Yulia Savicheva

Discography

Albums
 Nozhnisi (Ножницы; Scissors)
 Triumph (Триумф)

Singles
 "Сицилия" (feat. Glukoza)
 "Вдвоём" (feat. Nargiz)
 "Breach the Line"
 "С любимыми не расставайтесь" (feat. Nargiz)
 "Орлы или вороны" (feat. Grigory Leps)
 "Тем, кто рядом" (feat. Yulianna Karaulova)

References

External links

 

Maxim Fadeev's lyrics and translations

1968 births
Living people
People from Kurgan, Kurgan Oblast
Russian male composers
20th-century Russian male singers
20th-century Russian singers
Russian songwriters
Serebro
Fabrika Zvyozd
Russian record producers
Winners of the Golden Gramophone Award

Russian music video directors